The Very Best of the Beach Boys is a compilation album released by the American rock and roll band the Beach Boys. The album was released by EMI in 2001 and features 30 of their greatest hits digitally remastered. It is the first compilation of the Beach Boys that makes a full retrospective of their career. Other compilations had already been released throughout the years, but only focusing on certain time periods of the band, or focusing on their complete career, but with several volumes.

Track listing
All tracks written by Brian Wilson/Mike Love, unless otherwise noted.

"Good Vibrations" – 3:37 (from Smiley Smile)
"California Girls" (Single Version) – 2:43 (from Summer Days (And Summer Nights!!))
"I Get Around" – 2:14 (from All Summer Long)
"Wouldn't It Be Nice" (Brian Wilson, Tony Asher, Love) – 2:25 (from Pet Sounds)
"Surfin' Safari" – 2:07 (from Surfin' Safari)
"Fun, Fun, Fun" (Single Version) – 2:20 (from Shut Down Volume 2)
"Surfin' U.S.A." (Brian Wilson, Chuck Berry) – 2:29 (from Surfin' U.S.A.)
"Help Me Rhonda" – 2:47 (from Today!)
"Don't Worry Baby" (Brian Wilson, Roger Christian) – 2:50 (from Shut Down Volume 2)
"When I Grow Up (To Be a Man)" – 2:04 (from Today!)
"Little Deuce Coupe" (Brian Wilson, Christian) – 1:38 (from Surfer Girl)
"Dance, Dance, Dance" (Brian Wilson, Carl Wilson, Love) – 2:00 (from Today!)
"Little Honda" – 1:52 (from All Summer Long)
"Do You Wanna Dance?" (Bobby Freeman) – 2:21 (from Today!)
"Surfer Girl" (Brian Wilson) – 2:27 (from Surfer Girl)
"Then I Kissed Her" (Phil Spector, Ellie Greenwich, Jeff Barry) – 2:16 (from Summer Days (And Summer Nights!!))
"God Only Knows" (1996 Stereo Mix) (Brian Wilson, Asher) – 2:50 (from Pet Sounds, stereo remix from The Pet Sounds Sessions)
"Caroline, No" (Single Version, 1996 Stereo Mix) (Brian Wilson, Asher) – 2:19 (from Pet Sounds, stereo remix from The Pet Sounds Sessions)
"Sloop John B" (1996 Stereo Mix) (Traditional, Brian Wilson) – 2:55 (from Pet Sounds, stereo remix from The Pet Sounds Sessions)
"Barbara Ann" (Single Version) (Fred Fassert) – 2:06 (from Beach Boys' Party!)
"Heroes and Villains" (Brian Wilson, Van Dyke Parks) – 3:38 (from Smiley Smile)
"Do It Again" (Single Version) – 2:19 (from 20/20)
"Darlin'" – 2:13 (from Wild Honey)
"Wild Honey" – 2:38 (from Wild Honey)
"Break Away" (Brian Wilson, Murry Wilson) – 2:56 (non album single)
"Rock and Roll Music" (Single Version) (Berry) – 2:28 (from 15 Big Ones)
"I Can Hear Music" (Phil Spector, Ellie Greenwich, Jeff Barry) – 2:37 (from 20/20)
"Cotton Fields (The Cotton Song)" (Single Version) (Huddie Ledbetter) – 3:02 (from Stateside issues of Sunflower)
"Lady Lynda" (Alan Jardine, Ron Altbach) – 3:58 (from L.A. (Light Album))
"Kokomo" (Love, Scott McKenzie, Terry Melcher, John Phillips) – 3:37 (from Still Cruisin')

Charts

Certifications

References

2001 greatest hits albums
The Beach Boys compilation albums
Capitol Records compilation albums
EMI Records compilation albums